The 2015–16 season was the 109th season in Sevilla Fútbol Clubs history, and 15th consecutive season in La Liga. The team competed in La Liga, the Copa del Rey, the UEFA Champions League and the UEFA Europa League, winning the latter competition for a record third consecutive year. Sevilla did not win any away matches in La Liga.

Players

Squad information

Goals scored (per player)

Pre-season & friendlies

Competitions

Overall

Overview

UEFA Super Cup

La Liga

League table

Results summary

Results by round

Matches

Copa del Rey

Results summary
<div style="overflow: auto">

Matches

Round of 32

Round of 16

Quarter-finals

Semi-finals

Final

UEFA Champions League

Group stage

UEFA Europa League

Knockout phase

Round of 32

Round of 16

Quarter-finals

Semifinals

Final

Statistics

Appearances and goals
Last updated on 18 May 2016

|-
! colspan=16 style=background:#dcdcdc; text-align:center|Goalkeepers

|-
! colspan=16 style=background:#dcdcdc; text-align:center|Defenders

|-
! colspan=16 style=background:#dcdcdc; text-align:center|Midfielders

|-
! colspan=16 style=background:#dcdcdc; text-align:center|Forwards

|-
! colspan=16 style=background:#dcdcdc; text-align:center| Players who have made an appearance this season but have left the club

|-
|}

References

Sevilla FC seasons
Sevilla
Sevilla
UEFA Europa League-winning seasons